Marco Sangalli Fuentes (born 7 February 1992) is a Spanish professional footballer who plays for Racing de Santander as a winger.

Club career
Born in San Sebastián, Gipuzkoa of Italian descent, Sangalli joined Real Sociedad's youth setup in 2001, aged nine. He made his senior debut with the reserves in the 2011–12 season, in Segunda División B.

On 24 August 2013, Sangalli made his first-team – and La Liga – debut, playing the last 13 minutes in a 1–1 away draw against Elche CF. On 12 July of the following year, he was loaned to Segunda División club Deportivo Alavés until the end of the campaign.

Sangalli signed a two-year deal with CD Mirandés also of the second division on 26 June 2015. He scored his first goal as a professional on 12 September, helping to a 3–2 away defeat of Alavés.

On 4 July 2017, after suffering relegation, Sangalli moved to fellow league team AD Alcorcón after agreeing to a two-year contract. On 1 July 2019, he joined Real Oviedo still in the second tier on a two-year deal.

On 24 January 2023, Sangalli agreed to an 18-month contract with Racing de Santander, also in division two.

Personal life
Sangalli's younger brother, Luca, is also a footballer. An attacking midfielder, he too was groomed at Real Sociedad. His maternal uncle was Miguel Fuentes, former Real Sociedad player and president.

References

External links

1992 births
Living people
Spanish people of Italian descent
Sportspeople of Italian descent
Spanish footballers
Footballers from San Sebastián
Association football wingers
La Liga players
Segunda División players
Segunda División B players
Real Sociedad B footballers
Real Sociedad footballers
Deportivo Alavés players
CD Mirandés footballers
AD Alcorcón footballers
Real Oviedo players
Racing de Santander players